Giorgi Nadiradze may refer to:

 Giorgi Nadiradze (footballer) (born 1968), Georgian international footballer
 Giorgi Nadiradze (cyclist) (born 1987), Georgian road bicycle racer
 Giorgi Nadiradze (Photographer) (born 1993), Georgian Photographer

See also
 Nadiradze